The Murder in the Museum is a 1934 American film directed by Melville Shyer. The film is also known as The Five Deadly Vices (American reissue title).

Plot summary 
A city councilman is murdered while investigating allegations of drug dealing going on at a disreputable sideshow. The daughter of the chief suspect then teams up with a newspaper reporter to find the real killer.

Cast 
Henry B. Walthall as Bernard Latham Wayne, alias Prof. Mysto
John Harron as Jerry Ross
Phyllis Barrington as Lois Brandon
Tom O'Brien as Alfred Carr
Joseph W. Girard as Police Commissioner Brandon
Symona Boniface as Katura the Seeress
Donald Kerr as Museum Tour Guide
Sam Flint as Councilman Blair Newgate
John Elliott as Detective Chief Snell
Steve Clemente as Pedro Darro

Reuse of film 
Footage of a belly dancer shot for the film was reused in the 1943 film Confessions of a Vice Baron.

External links 

1934 films
American black-and-white films
American thriller films
1930s thriller films
Films directed by Melville Shyer
1930s English-language films
1930s American films